Elmsford Reformed Church and Cemetery is a historic Dutch Reformed church/meeting house and cemetery at 30 S. Central Avenue in Elmsford, Westchester County, New York, United States.  It was built in 1793 and is a two-story, wood-frame building.  It is constructed of hand-hewn beams, shingles, and hand-wrought nails.  Most of the ornamentation in the church dates to the 1820s.  It is almost identical to nearby Old St. Peter's Church.  The cemetery dates to the 18th century and includes the graves of a number of Revolutionary War veterans including Isaac Van Wart (1762 - 1828).

It was added to the National Register of Historic Places in 1983.

See also
National Register of Historic Places listings in southern Westchester County, New York

References

External links

Reformed Church in America churches in New York (state)
Churches on the National Register of Historic Places in New York (state)
Cemeteries on the National Register of Historic Places in New York (state)
Protestant Reformed cemeteries
National Register of Historic Places in Westchester County, New York
Churches completed in 1793
Cemeteries in Westchester County, New York
Churches in Westchester County, New York
18th-century churches in the United States
1793 establishments in New York (state)